Linariopsis is a genus of flowering plants belonging to the family Pedaliaceae.

Its native range is Western Tropical Africa to Angola.

Species:

Linariopsis chevalieri 
Linariopsis prostrata

References

Pedaliaceae
Lamiales genera